The 56th Writers Guild of America Awards, given in 2004, honored the film and television best writers of 2003.

Winners

Film

Best Adapted Screenplay
 American Splendor - Shari Springer Berman and Robert Pulcini
Cold Mountain - Anthony Minghella 
The Lord of the Rings: The Return of the King - Philippa Boyens, Peter Jackson and Fran Walsh
Mystic River - Brian Helgeland 
Seabiscuit - Gary Ross

Best Original Screenplay
 Lost in Translation - Sofia Coppola
Bend It Like Beckham - Guljit Bindra, Gurinder Chadha and Paul Mayeda Berges
Dirty Pretty Things - Steven Knight 
In America - Jim, Kirsten and Naomi Sheridan;
The Station Agent - Tom McCarthy

Television

Best Episodic Drama
 Day 2: 7:00 P.M. - 8:00 P.M - 24  - Evan Katz
Bounty - Law & Order - Michael S. Chernuchin
Loss - Law & Order: Special Victims Unit - Michelle Fazekas and Tara Butters
Abomination - Law & Order: Special Victims Unit - Michelle Fazekas and Tara Butters
Pilot - The O.C. - Josh Schwartz
Disaster Relief - The West Wing - Alexa Junge and Lauren Schmidt

Best Episodic Comedy
 No Sex, Please, We're Skittish - Frasier  - Bob Daily
Malcolm Films Reese - Malcolm in the Middle - Dan Kopelman
Day Care - Malcolm in the Middle - Gary Murphy and Neil Thompson
A Woman's Right to Shoes - Sex and The City - Jenny Bicks

Best Animation Screenplay
 Godfellas - Futurama

Best Original Long Form Screenplay

Best Adapted Long Form Screenplay
 Out of the Ashes - Anne Meredith
Bastogne (Episode 6 of 2001 miniseries 'Band of Brothers')

References
WGA - Previous award winners

2003
2003 film awards
2003 television awards
Writ
2003 guild awards
2003 in American cinema
2003 in American television
February 2004 events in the United States